The Walther PDP (Performance Duty Pistol) is a 9×19mm Parabellum semi-automatic pistol designed in 2021 by Walther Arms as a replacement for the Walther PPQ. The PDP has been designed to be more modular than previous Walther handguns, and has been described by Walther as their flagship handgun.

History 
The first pre-production PDPs were distributed in 2020, and the pistol was released in February 2021. As the PDP was released, the PPQ ceased production. In 2022, Walther released a new variant of the PDP at that year's SHOT Show, the PDP SD Pro, which includes a threaded barrel, optic cut, and an improved trigger.

Design 
The PDP is a striker-fired, recoil operated semi-automatic pistol chambered in 9×19mm Parabellum, with a longer grip and larger magazine capacity than the previous Walther design, the PPQ. The PDP is produced in full-size and compact grip frame variants. The grip uses a custom texture, which makes acquisition of the red dot easier, and improves handling of the pistol in adverse weather conditions.

The slide on the PDP is milled, allowing it to accept red dot sights without prior modification, and the slide contains serrations above the surface, making it easier to operate. The three-dot iron sight line features the same mounting method that is used on Glock pistols, meaning the PDP can accept aftermarket Glock iron sight lines.

The trigger is cross-compatible with the PPQ, but is lighter due to a shortened takeup.

Reception 
American Rifleman called the PDP an "excellent addition to the market that will allow Walther to compete strongly against the established leaders", praising its "best-in-class trigger, excellent controls and exceptional accuracy." The author said that it outperformed other striker-fired pistols he had used in the past, and went on to call the PDP his "current choice" for striker-fired pistols. Guns & Ammo described it as "the most modular and versatile pistol designed by Walther", also noting its accuracy and high quality trigger.

Guns.com called the PDP's ergonomics "revolutionary", and named it as one of the best guns of the year.

References

External links 

 Official owner's manual

Weapons and ammunition introduced in 2021
Walther semi-automatic pistols
Semi-automatic pistols of Germany
9mm Parabellum semi-automatic pistols
9×21mm IMI semi-automatic pistols